Colinas do Tocantins is a municipality located in the Brazilian state of Tocantins. Its population was 35,851 as of 2020 and its area is 844 km².

References

External links 
 official site

Municipalities in Tocantins